Maavari Manchitanam is a 1979 Indian Telugu-language drama film, produced by A. Pundarikakshaiah and directed by B. A. Subba Rao. It stars N. T. Rama Rao and Vanisri, with music composed by Master Venu. The film is a remake of the Hindi film Do Anjaane (1976), itself based on the novel Ratrir Yatri by Nihar Ranjan Gupta.

Cast 
N. T. Rama Rao
Vanisri
Jaggayya
Gummadi
Padmanabham
Nutan Prasad
Ramana Murthy
Chaya Devi
Pushpalatha
Baby Rohini

Soundtrack 

Music composed by Master Venu. Lyrics were written by C. Narayana Reddy.

References

External links 
 

Films directed by B. A. Subba Rao
Indian drama films
Telugu remakes of Hindi films
Films based on works by Nihar Ranjan Gupta